Galt Island could refer to:

 Galt Island (Ontario)
 Galt Island (Florida)